Heinonen is a Finnish surname. Notable people with the surname include:

 Aarre Heinonen (1906–2003), painter and professor
 Eero Heinonen (born 1979), Finnish bassist
 Juha Heinonen (1960–2007), Finnish mathematician
 Juhani Heinonen (born 1940), Finnish curler and coach
 Kaarlo Heinonen (1878–1944), Finnish politician
 Marjut Heinonen (born 1976), Finnish sport shooter
 Olli Heinonen (born 1946), Finnish nuclear expert
 Olli-Pekka Heinonen (born 1964), Finnish politician
 Osku Heinonen (born 1992), Finnish basketball player
 Petri Heinonen (born 1988), Finnish basketball player
 Raimo Heinonen (born 1935), Finnish gymnast
 Timo Heinonen (born 1975), Finnish politician
 Vappu Heinonen (1905–1999) Finnish social worker and politician
 Veikko Heinonen (1934–2015), Finnish ski jumper

Finnish-language surnames